Said Guliyev (born 19 July 1997) is an Azerbaijani taekwondo practitioner. He received a gold medal at the 2014 Summer Youth Olympics, held in Nanjing, China. He also won silver at 2014 Youth World Championships in Taipai.

References

Azerbaijani male taekwondo practitioners
1997 births
Living people
Taekwondo practitioners at the 2014 Summer Youth Olympics
Universiade medalists in taekwondo
Universiade bronze medalists for Azerbaijan
Youth Olympic gold medalists for Azerbaijan
Medalists at the 2017 Summer Universiade
21st-century Azerbaijani people